Hey Pa! There's a Goat on the Roof was a children's board game issued by Parker Brothers in 1966. The main objective to the overall game is to get more cans than any other player. The player with the most cans win the game.

Details
The game revolves around a game board featuring plastic farm-related items sticking out of it. Each player selects a goat as his/her playing piece placing the pieces along the goat pen on the board. Players move goat-shaped pieces around the board attempting to complete tasks that reward them with tin can pieces. The first player to move their goat onto the roof of the barn ends the game, and at that time whatever player has the most cans wins. Movement is determined by an included spinner which make the game purely on luck.

Game pieces
Deck of cards 
Six Goat player figures 
A farmer piece 
A bell 
Box of cans

References

Sources

Board games introduced in 1966
Children's board games
Roll-and-move board games
Parker Brothers games